The Baojun 730 is a seven-seat compact MPV produced by SAIC-GM-Wuling through the Baojun brand. The 730 was launched at the 2014 Auto China and developed at the SAIC-GM-Wuling Chinese joint venture specifically for the Chinese market. Baojun sold 250,000 units of the car in the first year of sales.



First generation (2014) 

The suspension system was tuned by Lotus.

Second generation (CN210M; 2017) 

The second-generation 730 was announced with an updated powertrain options and additional improvements in late November 2017. Apart from the engines available from the first-generation model, a turbocharged 1.5-litre four-cylinder engine and a six-speed dual-clutch transmission options were added. The second-generation 730 also has a multi-link rear suspension.

In November 2018, a 48V mild hybrid variant was added to the line up. It is only available for the 1.5-litre turbo engine and paired to a 6-speed manual transmission. The 1.8-litre model was also discontinued.

Wuling Cortez 
In Indonesia, the second-generation 730 is marketed under Wuling marque as the  Wuling Cortez. The name "Cortez" is taken from Spanish word "cortés", which means "courteous" in English. The 1.5-litre engine option was added in April 2018 with a sole 6-speed manual transmission, it is only available for the C trim and new S trim as the base model.

The "Cortez CT" with a turbocharged 1.5-litre engine option was made available from April 2019. It is mated to a continuously variable transmission sourced from Bosch. The car is also received several improvement such as new front grille, new interior colour, one push start-stop button, keyless entry and emergency stop signal. Later in July 2020, both the 1.5-litre and 1.8-litre naturally aspirated engines were discontinued and leaving the turbocharged 1.5-litre unit as the sole powertrain option. The base model CT S was later added to the line up in the same month. Compared to the old S trim, the engine cover, engine hood insulation and third row USB port were deleted, but it received CVT transmission just like the higher trims.

In February 2021, the Cortez CT was launched in Brunei Darussalam.

The Indonesian market Cortez was updated in March 2022 to include MyWuling+ vehicle telematics system and WIND (Wuling Indonesian Command) voice command system, which only supports the Indonesian language. It is also improved with new interior color, alloy wheels, 10.25-inch LCD display, anti pinch power windows, silver Wuling emblem and multipurpose seat tray on the second row. The "CT" naming was removed, the car is now sold with S, CE and EX trims.

Sales

References

External links 

 

730
Cars introduced in 2014
2020s cars
Compact MPVs
Front-wheel-drive vehicles
Vehicles with CVT transmission
Cars of China